The abbreviation MNU may refer to:

 Matariki Network of Universities, an international group
 MidAmerica Nazarene University, Olathe, Kansas, US
 The Maldives National University, Male'
 Mokpo National University, Muan/Mokpo, South Jeolla province, South Korea
 Mianyang Normal University, Mianyang, Sichuan, China
 Multi-National United, in the film District 9
 Myanmar Noble University, Yangon Myanmar